John Wallace Dashiell (May 9, 1902 in Jewett, Texas – May 20, 1972 in Pensacola, Florida) was a shortstop in  Major League Baseball. He played in one game for the 1924 Chicago White Sox.

He worked as a manager in the minor leagues from 1934-1948 in the West Dixie League, East Texas League, Southeastern League and Texas League.

External links

1902 births
1972 deaths
Major League Baseball shortstops
Chicago White Sox players
Baseball players from Texas
Minor league baseball managers
People from Jewett, Texas
Marshall Indians players
Shreveport Gassers players
Dallas Steers players
Corsicana Oilers players
Pensacola Pilots players
Chattanooga Lookouts players
Pensacola Flyers players
Atlanta Crackers players
Little Rock Travelers players
Jacksonville Jax players
Tyler Trojans players
Dallas Rebels players
Lon Morris Bearcats baseball players